Atabağı is a municipality (belde) in the Baykan District of Siirt Province in Turkey. The settlement is populated by Kurds of the Babosî tribe and had a population of 3,468 in 2021.

References 

Kurdish settlements in Siirt Province

Populated places in Siirt Province